Malwali Masjid/Mosque, Kakrail Markaz  is a mosque in the Kakrail neighbourhood of Ramna Dhaka, Bangladesh. Located near Ramna Park, it is the centre of the Tabligh Jamat in Bangladesh.

Management
The mosque is being managed by two disputed groups of tablighi jaamat. Followers of Aalami Suras controls the markaz for 28 days and followers of Nizamuddin (Main Stream Tablighi Jamaat) controls the markaz for 14 days

History
There is disagreement as to when and by whom the mosque was first built but it is seemingly the case that a previous mosque existed in the premises prior to Tablighi administration. Some claim that the original mosque was made of tin and built by the gardeners (known as Malis) of nearby Ramna Park. It was known as Malwali Masjid. It is known from the senior attendants that a mosque was established here by a member of the Nawab family of Dhaka about 300 years ago, along with other installations by the family. In the beginning, the mosque was quite small and had a small pond in front.

In 1952, the Tablighi Jamaat movement in Bangladesh relocated their headquarters from Khan Mohammad Mridha Mosque, and declared the Kakrail Mosque as its Markaz (centre).
 The three-storey mosque was rebuilt under the supervision of Haji Abdul Muqit, an architect belonging to the Tablighi Jamaat.

Architecture
The present mosque is designed by engineer Haji Abdul Muqit. Adjacent to the roof of the mosque are triangular carvings. The pillars of the mosque are square in shape. The west wall of the mosque is rippling. The mosque also has wide verandas on three sides. On the south and north sides there are two pond-like houses for Wudu rituals and can serve hundreds of people at once. There are also more modern arrangements for performing Wudu outside of the mosque building. A short distance north of the mosque is a two-storey building for toilets and bathrooms. There are no entrance doors and so it is open day and night.

References 

Mosques in Dhaka
Tablighi Jamaat